The 157th Infantry Brigade is an active/reserve component (AC/RC) unit based at Camp Atterbury, Indiana. The unit is responsible for training selected United States Army Reserve and National Guard units. The unit was activated using the assets of the 5th Brigade, 87th Division. The brigade is a subordinate unit of First Army Division East.

Activation
The 79th Division "Liberty" Division, also known as the "Lorraine" Division, was a National Army division established 5 August 1917 by the War Department to be formed at Camp Meade, Maryland. The division was commanded by Maj. Gen. Joseph E. Kuhn. Draftees were from Pennsylvania and Maryland. Movement overseas commenced on 6 July 1918 and was completed by 3 August 1918. The 157th Infantry Brigade was commanded by Brig. Gen. William Jones Nicholson.

The Brigade consisted of:
  Headquarters and Headquarters Company
  313th Infantry Regiment
  314th Infantry Regiment
  311th Machine Gun Battalion

Shrouded in secrecy, the brigade left from Hoboken, New Jersey in July 1918 on the SS Leviathan, a speedy ex-German liner that arrived at Brest, France the morning of 15 July 1918. They trained for two months at Champ Little behind the French lines. On 26 September 1918 they "went over the top" in the Meuse-Argonne offensive. In a period of heartbreaking losses, the men struggled through nine kilometers of barbed wire and pot-marked earth. They destroyed German defenses that were said to be impregnable. That night they were on the outskirts of Montfaucon, headquarters of the enemy command. The 313th fought until the end, 11 November 1918. Gen. John J. Pershing commended the men of the 79th Division, and especially the 313th Infantry Regiment whose forces penetrated deeper into enemy territory than any other outfit.

Organization from 1963 to 1995
The 157th Infantry Brigade (Mechanized) was reactivated on 3 January 1963 in Upper Darby, Pennsylvania using assets from the inactivating 79th Infantry Division. It moved to Horsham on 31 January 1968, where it remained until its inactivation on 1 September 1995 during the post-Cold War drawdown.  In 1966 this Brigade consisted of 3 Infantry Battalions: the 1–313th IN co-located Indiantown Gap Military Reservation (IGMR), since redesignated Fort Indiantown Gap (FIG), Annville, PA; and at Lock Haven, PA; the 1–314th IN (Mechanized) co-located at Bristol and Warrington, PA; the 1–315th IN located at 5200 Wissahickon Ave, Philadelphia, PA. It had 2 Armor Battalions at that time: namely, the 4–77th AR (location uncertain) and the 6–68th AR co-located at Bethlehem, PA and IGMR, PA. After the Arab-Israeli War of 1967, the 4–77th was disbanded, its armored vehicles sent to Israel to replace Israeli losses, and its personnel merged into the 6–68th AR. That same year, the Brigade's 1–314th IN (Mechanized) lost its armored vehicles- primarily M578s, M113s, M59s and M577s all of which were also sent to Israel to replace their war losses. It was not until the summer of 1971 that the 1–314th IN was re-designated a Mechanized unit. By the summer of 1973 the 1–313th IN was disbanded with its personnel and company units redesignated as part of the 1–314th IN.

The unit consisted of:
  Headquarters and Headquarters Company – Horsham, Pennsylvania
  Troop C, 9th Cavalry – Wilkes Barre, Pennsylvania
  1st Battalion, 313th Infantry (Mechanized)- Fort Indiantown Gap, Pennsylvania
  1st Battalion, 314th Infantry (Mechanized) – Lock Haven, Pennsylvania
  1st Battalion, 315th Infantry (Mechanized) – Germantown, Pennsylvania
  6th Battalion, 68th Armor – Bethlehem, Pennsylvania
  4th Battalion, 77th Armor – Reading, Pennsylvania
  3rd Battalion, 42nd Field Artillery – Bristol, Pennsylvania
  157th Support Battalion – Edgemont, Pennsylvania
  420th Engineer Company – Pittsburgh, Pennsylvania

Organization
In 2006, as part of the Army's Transformation Plan, the 5th Brigade, 87th Division was reflagged as the 157th Infantry Brigade.  As part of Operation Bold Shift, the battalion changed their missions to better train Army Reserve and National Guard units.
The unit is currently composed of:
  Headquarters and Headquarters Detachment – Camp Atterbury, Indiana
  2nd Battalion, 289th Regiment (Maneuver)
  1st Battalion, 290th Regiment (Brigade Support Battalion)
  2nd Battalion, 307th Regiment (Field Artillery)
  1st Battalion, 335th Regiment (Maneuver)
  3rd Battalion, 335th Regiment (Training Support Battalion)
  1st Battalion, 345th Regiment (Brigade Engineer Battalion)
  1st Battalion, 362nd Regiment (Air Defense Artillery)
  2nd Battalion, 337th Regiment (Training Support Battalion)
  2nd Battalion, 338th Regiment (Training Support Battalion)
  3rd Battalion, 338th Regiment (Training Support Battalion)
  3rd Battalion, 411th Regiment (Logistics Support Battalion),

For further information see The Brigade, A History by John J. McGrath from the Combat Studies Institute Press, Fort Leavenworth, Kansas.

Lineage
Constituted 5 August 1917 in the National Army as Headquarters, 158th Infantry Brigade, and assigned to the 79th Division

Organized 25 August 1917 at Camp Meade, Maryland

Demobilized 7 June 1919 at Camp Dix, New Jersey

Reconstituted 24 June 1921 in the Organized Reserves as Headquarters and Headquarters Company, 157th Infantry Brigade, and assigned to the 79th Division

Organized in November 1921 at Wilkes-Barre, Pennsylvania

Redesignated 23 March 1925 as Headquarters and Headquarters Company, 157th Brigade

Redesignated 24 August 1936 as Headquarters and Headquarters Company, 157th Infantry Brigade

Converted and redesignated 12 February 1942 as the 79th Reconnaissance Troop (less 3d Platoon), 79th Division (Headquarters and Headquarters Company, 158th Infantry Brigade, concurrently converted and redesignated as the 3d Platoon, 79th Reconnaissance Troop, 79th Division)

Troop ordered into active military service 15 June 1942 and reorganized at Camp Pickett, Virginia, as the 79th Cavalry Reconnaissance Troop, an element of the 79th Division (later redesignated as the 79th Infantry Division)

Reorganized and redesignated 2 August 1943 as the 79th Reconnaissance Troop, Mechanized

Inactivated 11 December 1945 at Camp Kilmer, New Jersey

Activated 28 January 1947 at Philadelphia, Pennsylvania, as the 79th Mechanized Cavalry Reconnaissance Troop

(Organized Reserves redesignated 25 March 1948 as the Organized Reserve Corps; redesignated 9 July 1952 as the Army Reserve)

Reorganized and redesignated 15 July 1949 as the 79th Reconnaissance Company

Inactivated 20 April 1959 at Philadelphia, Pennsylvania

Converted and redesignated (less 3d Platoon) 5 November 1962 as Headquarters and Headquarters Company, 157th Infantry Brigade, and relieved from assignment to the 79th Infantry Division (3d Platoon, 79th Reconnaissance Company, concurrently redesignated as Headquarters and Headquarters Company, 158th Infantry Brigade – hereafter separate lineage)

Brigade activated 7 January 1963 at Upper Darby, Pennsylvania

Location changed 31 January 1968 to Horsham, Pennsylvania

Inactivated 1 September 1995 at Horsham, Pennsylvania

Withdrawn 24 October 1997 from the Army Reserve and allotted to the Regular Army; Headquarters concurrently activated at Fort Jackson, South Carolina

Inactivated 16 October 1999 at Fort Jackson, South Carolina

Activated 1 December 2006 at Fort Jackson, South Carolina

Campaign Credit

Decorations

References

External links
 Heraldry of the 157th
 Official 157th history
 Brigade Overview

157
Military units and formations established in 1917